Paper Thin Walls is an American indie rock band from Orange County, California, consisting of Sergio Garcia (lead vocals), Adam Babashoff (bass and vocals), Adam Castilla (guitar and vocals), and Maya Tuttle (drums and vocals).

History
Paper Thin Walls was formed in late 2006 by friends Adam Babashoff and Adam Castilla. Through mutual acquaintances, they met singer Sergio Garcia and drummer Maya Tuttle, who completed the 4-piece dancey rock band in January 2007. The group quickly started to gain attention around both the Orange County and LA music scenes.

Within 3 months of releasing their first EP, Wake Up, at The Troubadour in Hollywood, Paper Thin Walls was selected as the winner of Ziddio.com's "Led Zeppelin Dream Gig Contest."  The band was flown to London, England, to perform at the after party of the Ahmet Ertegün Tribute Concert (Led Zeppelin Reunion) at O2 arena on December 10, 2007.

Subsequent projects

Adam Castilla and Maya Tuttle are currently performing in the indie rock band The Colourist, along with guitarist Kollin Johannsen and keyboardist Justin Wagner.

Discography

EPs
 Wake Up (2007)

Television appearances
Interview on The Barry Nolan Show

References

External links
Paper Thin Walls' official Myspace
Article on Gibson's website
The Orange County Register Interview with Paper Thin Walls
"Unsigned Band to Join Led Zeppelin Reunion Bill," NME, December 7, 2007
Paper Thin Walls on NPR

Indie rock musical groups from California
Musical groups from Orange County, California